This list of World War II military operations is for Mediterranean and Middle Eastern region land operations and operations within the Mediterranean Sea, e.g. naval operations such as :Category:Malta Convoys.

Axis
 25 (1941)    — invasion of Yugoslavia.
Strafe ("Punishment") (1941)  — Bombing of Belgrade by Luftwaffe as part of Operation 25
 Achse ("Axis") (1943)  — response to Italian defection. Final plan Achse represented combination of plan Schwartz and original plan Achse. 
 Aida (1942)   — Afrika Korps advance into Egypt.
 Little Atlas Agadir (1944)  —failed operation to fly agents into Morocco
 Bodden (1942)   — German intelligence activity around Gibraltar
 Brandung (1941)   — Axis attack toward El Alamein that became the Battle of Alam el Halfa
 Capri (1942)   — counter-attack at Medenine, Tunisia
 Etappenhase (1944)  —aborted attempt to establish assault bases along Algerian-Tunisian border
 Felix (1940–41)    — planned invasion of Gibraltar.
 Frühlingswind ("Spring wind") (1943)   — attack on CCA/1st at Sidi bou Zid.
 Gertrud — planned response in event Turkey joined the Allies.
 Herbstnebel 2 (1944)  —  rejected proposal to withdraw troops in Italy behind the Po River.
 Herkules (1942)  — planned Axis airborne invasion of Malta.
 Isabella (1941)  — plans for operations on the Iberian peninsula.
 Ilana (1942)  — amended Isabella.
 Gisella (1942)  — Isabella renamed.
 Nürnberg (1943)  — third and final plan in case of Allied landings in the Iberian peninsula.
 Lehrgang ("Training Course") (1943)  — evacuation of Sicily following Allied Operation Husky.
 Marita (1941)  — invasion of Greece.
 Alpenveilchen ("Alpine Violet")  (1941) — planned German intervention in Albania
 Merkur ("Mercury") (1941)  — German invasion of Crete
 Mittelmeer ("Mediterrean") (1940–1941)  — reinforcement of Regia Aeronautica in Mediterranean by X Fliegerkorps
 Morgenluft ("Morning Air") (1941)  — occupation of Gafsa
 Morgenrote ("Dawn") (1944)  — German counterattack against Allied Operation Shingle.
 Moro (1941)   — refuelling of U-boats by Spain
 Ochsenkopf ("Ox head") (1942)  —
 Otto (1943)   — anti-Partisan operation
 Skorpion ("Scorpion") (1941)   — Axis recapture of Halfaya Pass
 Sommernachtstraum ("Summers Night Dream") (1941)   — 
Sonnenblume (Sun Flower)  — movement Afrika Korps troops to North Africa as a result of Compass
 Sturmflut ("Storm tide") (1941)  — 
 Theseus (1942)   — offensive to drive Allies out of Cyrenaica and Egypt
 Wintergewitter ("Winter Storm") (1944)   — axis offensive against the American 92nd Infantry Division in the Apennines
 Venezia (1941)   — axis attack on the Gazala Line

Allies
Abstention (1941)  — British attempt to seize the island of Kastelorizo thwarted by Italian forces
Acrobat (1942)  — British proposal to attack Tripoli 
 Abeam (1941)   — disinformation operation to convince Italians of the presence of British paratroops in north Africa
 Accolade (1943)   — proposed British occupation of Rhodes, and subsequently, failed occupation of the Dodecanese
 Agreement (1942)    — British, Rhodesian and New Zealand raids on several North African targets
Daffodil (1942)  — Tobruk raid  
Hyacinth (1942)  — Barce raid
Snowdrop (1942)  — Benghazi raid
Tulip (1942)  — Jalo oasis recapture
 Anvil (1944)    — Allied invasion of Southern France. Name later changed to Dragoon
Astrologer (1941)  — failed attempt to run 2 unescorted transports to Malta
Avalanche (1943)   — Allied landings near Salerno, Italy
 Boardman (1943) — deception operation for Avalanche
 Giant II  — cancelled landing of U.S. 82nd Airborne near Rome.
 Battleaxe (1941)   — failed British attack on Axis forces in North Africa to relieve Tobruk
 Backbone & Backbone II (1942 & 1943)  — contingency plans to occupy Spanish Morocco and area around Gibraltar if Germans entered Spain
 Ballast (?)  — plan to support Gibraltar
 Blackthorn (?)  — plan to support Gibraltar
 Challenger (?)  — plan to seize Ceuta
 Baritone (1942)  — delivery of 32 Spitfires to Malta from 
 Baytown (1943)  — Allied landings in Calabria, Italy
 Slapstick (1943)  — British landings at Taranto
 Begonia (1943)  — airborne part of attempted British POW rescue in Italy
 Bellows (1942)  — delivery of 38 Spitfires to Malta from 
 Bowery (1942)   — delivery of 64 Spitfires to Malta from HMS Eagle and USS Wasp
 Brasso (1942)  — scheme for safe unloading and dispersal of ships' cargo at Malta
 Brevity (1941)  — British capture of Halfaya Pass, Egypt
 Buffalo (1944)  — breakout from the Anzio beachhead
 Calendar (1942)   — delivery of 47 Spitfires to Malta from USS Wasp
 Callboy (1941)  — delivery of Swordfish and Albacores to Malta from 
 Candytuft (1943)  — SAS operation to destroy rail bridge between Pesaro and Fano
 Canuck (1945)  — SAS operation to disrupt enemy communications in north-west Italy
 Chaucer (1944)  — SAS operation to disrupt enemy communications in north-west Italy
 Chesterfield (1944)   — assault on Hitler Line
 Coat (1940)  — passage  of naval reinforcements through the Mediterranean
 Cold Comfort (1945)  — failed SAS raid to block rail route through Brenner Pass
 Collar (1940)  — naval reinforcements from Gibraltar to Egypt, carrying supplies and personnel for Malta and Egypt.
 Colossus (1941)  — experimental airborne raid on Italian aqueduct near Calitri in southern Italy
 Compass (1940)  — British counteroffensive in North Africa
 Corkscrew (1943)  — Allied occupation of Pantellaria
 Crusader (1941)   — British relief of Tobruk
 Chieftain (1941)  — attempt to divert German aircraft with a decoy convoy from Gibraltar
 Landmark (1941)  — diversion with a non-existent convoy to Malta
 Crupper (1942)  — failed attempt to run two unescorted freighters into Malta
 Demon (1941)  — evacuation of Allied troops from Greece
 Devon (1943)  — Special Raiding Squadron attack on Termoli
 Diadem (1944)    — successful Allied assault on German Gustav Line defences in Italy.
Strangle (1944)  — Allied bombing of German supply lines, in preparation for operation Diadem.
 Dragoon (1944)    — Allied landing in southern France
 Dove   — gliderborne component of Dragoon
 Romeo  — Free French assault on German coastal battery
 Rosie  — Free French commando raid near Théoule-sur-Mer
 Rugby   — Airborne portion of Dragoon
 Sitka   — 1st Special Services Force assault on Îles d'Hyères
 Span — deception operation in support of Dragoon
 Dunlop (1941)  — delivery of 24 Hurricanes to Malta from HMS Ark Royal (1 lost en route)
 Encore (1945) — Allied assault on mountain positions in Italy
 Excess (1941)  — Malta convoy to reinforce Greece and Malta
 MC4 (1941)  — shipping movements to and from Malta
 Exporter (1941)   — Allied invasion of Vichy-controlled Syria and Lebanon
 Fustian (1943)  — British airborne capture of a bridge on Sicily
 Galia (1944)  — British SAS operation in northwestern Italy in support of the US 5th Army
 Grog (1941)  — bombardment of Genoa
 Guillotine (1941)  — transfer of troops to  Cyprus
 Guillotine (1943)  — Allied advance from Cyrenaica to Tripolitania
 Gymnast  — early name for Operation Torch
 Halberd (1941)  — Malta convoy via Gibraltar
 Hawthorn (1943) — Special Boat Service raid on Sardinia
 Hats (1940)  — attempt to provoke Italians into a fleet action and supplies for Malta and Egypt from Gibraltar
 Squawk (1940)  — radio transmissions by destroyers, intended to mislead or confuse Italians
 Hide (1940)  — movements by Force H to cover convoy and escort HMS Malaya to Gibraltar (linked to Operation MC2)
 Seek (1940)  — anti-submarine sweep ahead of Hide
 Hurry (1940)  — delivery of 12 Hurricanes to Malta from 
 Spark (1940)  — diversionary radio transmissions by HMS Enterprise
 Husky   (1943) — Allied invasion of Sicily
 Chestnut (1943)  — failed SAS operation to disrupt enemy communications in northern Sicily
 Ladbroke (1943)  —  British glider landing near Syracuse, Sicily
 Mincemeat (1943)  — disinformation operation prior to the invasion of Sicily
 Brimstone (1943)  — fictional invasion of Sardinia, part of cover for Husky
 Narcissus (1943)  — British SAS raid on a lighthouse in Sicily
 Insect (1942)  — delivery of 28 Spitfires from HMS Eagle
 Jonquil (1943)  — seaborne part of attempted British POW rescue in Italy (see also: Begonia)
 Judgement (1940)  — British air attack on Italian fleet in Taranto harbour
 Julius (1942)  — coordinated supply convoys to Malta
 Harpoon (1942)  — Malta convoy from Gibraltar
 Salient (1942)  — delivery of Spitfires to Malta from HMS Eagle
 Style (1942)  — delivery of Spitfires to Malta from HMS Eagle
 Vigorous (1942)  — Malta convoy from Alexandria
 Rembrandt (1942)  — Malta convoy from Alexandria, early portion of Vigorous
 LB (1942)  — delivery of 16 Spitfires to Malta from HMS Eagle 
 Lightfoot (1942)   — first attack by the British and Australians at El Alamein
 Bertram (1942) — deception operation in preparation for the Second Battle of El Alamein
 Supercharge (1942)   — second stage attack by British and New Zealanders at El Alamein
 Lustre (1941)     — Allied reinforcement of Greece
 Mandibles (1941)    — a planned 1940-1941 British amphibious assault on Rhodes, Leros and the Dodecanese Islands in the Aegean Sea.
 Manna (1944)  — Allied re-occupation of Greece and Aegean Islands
 Marigold (1943)  — unsuccessful SAS/SBS mission to snatch a prisoner from Sardinia
 MB8 (1940)   — passage of convoys from Alexandria to Malta and from Port Said to Crete
 Barbarity (1940)  — carriage of military personnel and equipment by cruiser to Suda Bay
 MC2 (1940)  — passage westwards of HMS Malaya (linked to Operation Hide)
 Outing & Outing II (1944)  — anti-shipping operations in Aegean Sea
 Pedestal (1942)  — Allied convoy from Gibraltar to Malta.
 Ascendant (1942)  — escort of freighters from Malta
 Bellows (1942)  — delivery of Spitfires to Malta from  
 Berserk (1942)  — exercise to establish fleet air tactics
 Ceres (1942)  — scheme for safe unloading and dispersal of Pedestal cargoes at Malta
 Perpetual (1941) — delivery of aircraft to Malta
 Picket (1942)  — delivery of 16 Spitfires to Malta from HMS Eagle and Argus
 Pilgrim (1941)  — contingency plan to seize Canary Islands
 Pinpoint (1942)  — delivery run to Malta by HMS Welshman
 Propeller (1941)  — passage of Empire Guillemot to Malta
 Portcullis (1942)  — convoy from Alexandria to Malta
 Pugilist (1943)    — Allied attack on Mareth Line and advance to Sfax
 Puma (1941)  — contingency plan to seize Canary Islands
 Quadrangle (1942)  — three convoy movements to and from Malta
 Roast (1945)  — action by British Commandos at Comacchio lagoon, north east Italy
 Sapphic (?)  — plan to support  Gibraltar
 Salient (1941)  — delivery of 32 Spitfires to Malta from HMS Eagle
 Saxifrage (1943)  — four parties from 2 SAS to destroy the railway line between Ancona and Pescara
 Shingle (1944)   — Allied landings at Anzio
 Chettyford — deception plan to support Shingle
 Maple (1944)  — several SAS operations to cut railways in Italy in support of Anzio landings
 Baobab (1945)  — SAS operation to destroy rail bridge between Pesaro and Fano
 Driftwood (1944)  — failed raid on rail targets
 Thistledown (1944)  — raid on rail targets near Terni and Orvieto
 Pomegranate (1944) — SAS raid in support of Shingle
 Speedwell (1945)  — Behind enemy lines operation by the British Special Air Service to disrupt rail communications in northern Italy.
 Spotter (1942)  — delivery of 15 Spitfires to Malta from HMS Eagle and Argus
 Status 1 (1941)  — delivery of 26 Hurricanes and a Swordfish to Malta from HMS Ark Royal
 Status 2 (1941)  — delivery of Hurricanes and a Swordfish to Malta from HMS Ark Royal and Furious
 Stone Age (or: Stoneage) (1942)  — Malta convoy from Alexandria
 Substance (1941)  — Malta convoy
 Sunrise (1945) — negotiations leading to German surrender in Italy
 Supercharge II (1942)   —  breakthrough at Tebaga Gap, Tunisia
 Survey (1943)  — Malta convoy from Alexandria
 Temple (1941)  — failed attempt to run a merchant ship (Parracombe) to Malta
 Tiger (1941)  — Malta convoy via Gibraltar
 Tombola (1945)  — SAS raid in Italy
 Torch (1942)   — Allied landings in Morocco and Algeria originally titled Gymnast
 Blackstone (1942)  — US assault on Safi, Morocco
 Brushwood (1942)  — US assault on Fedala
 Goalpost (1942)  — US assault on Port Lyautey (now Kenitra)
 Perpetual (1942)  — British landings at Cap Carbon
 Reservist (1942)   — failed Allied attack on Oran
 Tracer (1941)  — delivery of 48 Hurricanes to Malta from HMS Ark Royal and Victorious
 Train (1942)  — delivery of 29 Spitfires to Malta from Furious
 Vesuve (1943)  — Free French landings in Corsica
 Vulcan (1943)    — final Allied assault on Axis forces trapped around Tunis
 White (1940)  — delivery of 12 Hurricanes to Malta (4 arrive, 8 lost en route)
 Winch (1940)  — delivery of 12 Hurricanes to Malta from HMS Ark Royal
 Wop (1943)  — US 1st Division occupies Gafsa
 Zombie (1945) — Operation Cold Comfort, renamed

 
Naval and land based operations in Mediterranean Sea Area
Mediterranean
Mediterranean-related lists

ca:Operacions de la Segona Guerra Mundial